Selasia isabellae, is a species of false firefly beetle found in Sri Lanka.

References 

Elateridae
Insects of Sri Lanka
Insects described in 1909